Turbinaria may refer to:

Turbinaria (alga), a genus of seaweeds in the family Sargassaceae
Turbinaria (coral), a genus of coral in the family Dendrophylliidae